Diario Frontera is a Venezuelan regional newspaper, headquartered in Ejido, in the state of Mérida. Founded in 1978, its slogan is "El diario del occidente del país" (The Daily of the occident of the country).

Features 
The newspaper is distributed as standard colored format. It contains regional, national, and international news. It has two supplements, issued every Sunday: Aquí entre Nos magazine, and a supplement for children, Chipilín. It has special editions for occasions like Feria del Sol and Día del Trabajador.

History 
Diario Frontera was founded by José Benedicto Monsalve, along with the writer Rafael Ángel Gallegos, who was the first director, on 12 August 1978. At the beginning, it was printed in black and white using a rotary owned by Diario Critica.

In the 1980s, Diario Frontera became a generalist newspaper, printed in black and white, and with 20 pages. Since 1989, it has printed a page or a section dedicated to the University of the Andes, due to the high number of students and the importance of the University in the life of the city.

In June 2005, it printed an inquiry about a student of the university killed by the police. Diario wrote that the student had been hit by the policemen, but also revealed his belonging to an armed political group. The headquarters of the newspaper was attacked by groups of students; it was the beginning of riots that then spread all over the city. The pleas of Reporters Without Borders remained unheard.

In 2008, on the occasion of the thirtieth anniversary, Diario has revamped graphics (logo, typeface).

Directors 
Rafael Ángel Gallegos
Alcides Monsalve

See also 
List of Venezuelan newspapers

References

External links
Diario Frontera website

1978 establishments in Venezuela
Newspapers published in Venezuela
Publications established in 1978
Spanish-language newspapers